De Ropta is a smock mill north of Metslawier, Friesland, Netherlands which was built in 1840 and is in working order. The mill is listed as a Rijksmonument.

History

A mill was built by Romke van der Werf of Betterwird in 1836, but it was blown down in 1840. It was rebuilt on a 20 Dutch feet (approximately ) high brick base. The mill was struck by lightning in 1889, but no serious damage was caused. The mill ceased working commercially in 1961. It was sold to the municipality of Dongeradeel in 1962. It carried Patent sails until 1966, when they were replaced by Common sails. The mill was restored in 1966, 1971, and 1996. The mill is one of the most complete corn and pearl barley mills in Friesland. It is listed as a Rijksmonument, number 31577.

Description

De Ropta is what the Dutch describe as a "stellingmolen". The smock and cap are thatched. The mill is winded by tailpole and winch. The sails are Common sails. The stocks are of interest in that one pair is of rivetted construction, made by the Gorter shipyard of Hoogezand, Groningen. The other stock, of welded construction, is claimed to be the first made by the millwright Christiaan Bremer of Adorp, Groningen. The sails are carried on a cast-iron windshaft, which was cast  in 1891 by De Prins van Oranje of The Hague, South Holland. The windshaft also carries the brake wheel, which has 61 cogs. This drives the wallower (32 cogs) at  the top of the upright shaft. At the bottom of the upright shaft, the great spur wheel, which has 95 cogs. The great spur wheel drives two pairs of millstones via a lantern pinion stone nut which have 24 staves each. The mill also drives two pairs of  diameter millstones which are used for milling pearl barley. These are driven by lantern pinion wallowers which have 20 staves each.

Public access

De Ropta is open to the public by appointment.

Interior

References

Windmills in Friesland
Windmills completed in 1840
Smock mills in the Netherlands
Grinding mills in the Netherlands
Agricultural buildings in the Netherlands
Rijksmonuments in Friesland
Octagonal buildings in the Netherlands